1200 Curfews is a live album by the Indigo Girls, released in 1995.

Most of the recordings come from their 1994-95 tour to support the Swamp Ophelia album; seven are from the 1992-93 tour to support the album Rites of Passage.

The liner notes joke about the inclusion of the song "Land of Canaan".  The song had already appeared (in different recordings each time) on their 1985 EP, their 1987 debut album Strange Fire, and their 1989 eponymous second album.

Track listing

Tracks marked 'duo' feature only Amy Ray and Emily Saliers with no accompaniment.

Personnel

Lead vocals
Amy Ray and Emily Saliers sing lead vocal on their respective compositions; the other sings harmony and/or support vocals.
Amy Ray sings lead on 1:3, 1:12, 2:3 and 2:13 and not at all on 1:4 and 2:11.
Emily Saliers sings lead on 2:11 with accompaniment from Gail Ann Dorsey and Jimmy Descant and the intro to 1:12 and 2:13. She sings solo on 1:4 and does not sing on 2:14.
They share lead vocals on 1:10 though Emily sings first. 
Jerry Marotta sings lead on the third verse of 1:12.

Musicians
Amy Ray - vocals, acoustic rhythm guitar, electric guitar (1:12, 2:11, 2:13), melodica (1:14)
Emily Saliers - vocals, acoustic rhythm & lead guitar, electric guitar (1:12, 2:13), dobro (2:7)
Sara Lee - bass (except 2:10, 2:12 and duo tracks), penny whistle (2:12)
Jerry Marotta - drums (all except 2:4, 2:10 and duo tracks), saxophone (2:4), backing vocals (1:14, 2:11, 2:13)
Scarlet Rivera - violin (1:5, 1:10, 2:1, 2:3)
Jane Scarpantoni - cello (1:3, 1:5, 1:8-12, 2:3, 2:6-7, 2:11, 2:13), penny whistle (1:2)
Michelle Malone - harmony vocals (2:1, 2:3), mandolin (2:1)
Gail Ann Dorsey and Jimmy Descant - guest vocals (2:11)
Sandy Garfinkle - harmonica (2:10)
Michael Lorant - tambourine (2:10)
Sheila Doyle - violin (2:12)
Dede Vogt and Gerard McHugh - backing vocals (2:12)
Russell Carter - backing vocals (2:13)

References

Indigo Girls live albums
1995 live albums
Epic Records live albums